Eurema alitha, the scalloped grass yellow, is a butterfly species in the genus Eurema. It was first described as Terias alitha by father and son entomologists Cajetan  and Rudolf Felder in 1862. It is found in Southeast Asia.

Subspecies
E. a. alitha (Mindanao)
E. a. basilana (Basilan)
E. a. djampeana (Tanah Jampea)
E. a. esakii (Taiwan)
E. a. garama (Sulu Islands)
E. a. gradiens (northern Borneo)
E. a. jalendra (Palawan)
E. a. novaguineensis (Papua, Indonesia, Papua New Guinea)
E. a. samarana (Samar)
E. a. sanama (Sulu Islands)
E. a. sangira (Sangi)
E. a. zita (Sulawesi)
E. a. lorquini (Sulawesi)

References

alitha
Butterflies of Asia
Butterflies described in 1862
Butterflies of Borneo